Since 1998, no football tournament took place at the Odesur Games ('Olympic Games for South American countries'). Odesur abbreviates Organización Deportiva Sudamericana. Instead futsal events have been taking place since 2002.

Results

Men's tournament

Women's tournament

Medal table

References

Juegos Odesur (Futsal), RSSSF.com

 
O
South American Games
South